La Ceiba is a municipality, the capital of the Honduran department of Atlántida and a port city on the northern coast of Honduras in Central America. It is located on the southern edge of the Caribbean, forming part of the south eastern boundary of the Gulf of Honduras. With an estimated population of 199,080 living in approximately 170 residential areas (called colonias or barrios), it is the fourth most populous and third most important city in the country.

La Ceiba was officially founded on 23 August 1877. The city was named after a giant ceiba tree that grew near the old dock. The city has been officially proclaimed the "Eco-Tourism Capital of Honduras," as well as the "Entertainment Capital of Honduras". Every year, on the third or fourth Saturday of May, the city holds its famous carnival to commemorate Isidore the Laborer (Spanish San Isidro Labrador). During this time, the city is host to approximately 500,000 tourists.

History 

In 1872 Manuel Hernández built a small shack under the Ceiba tree that grew near the old docks. Over time, more and more people from present-day Honduras (especially the departments of Olancho and Santa Barbara), and from around the world settled in La Ceiba. Workers were attracted to jobs associated with the banana industry, which became important to the regional economy.

In the late 19th century, the banana business caught the attention of big North American banana companies, such as the Vaccaro Brothers' Standard Fruit Company from New Orleans. This new economic activity attracted national and international immigrantworkers to La Ceiba. The current neighbourhood known as Barrio Inglés was the first recognised neighbourhood in the city. It was so named after the many English-speaking people living in the barrio. At that point the main thoroughfare of La Ceiba was present-day Avenida La Republica, where the train tracks were laid. The rail line was built by the Standard Fruit Company (now Standard Fruit de Honduras, a Dole subsidiary) for transport of its commodity to ships at the port from the banana plantations. This company was largely responsible for the early growth of the city.

La Ceiba was declared a municipality on 23 August 1877. At that time Marco Aurelio Soto was President of  Honduras. La Ceiba was the centre of banana and pineapple business, the basis of its economy. Other companies developed in the city, such as:

 Cervecería Hondureña, the national brewing company and holder of the Coca-Cola licence in Honduras. Founded in 1918.
 Fábrica de Manteca y Jabón Atlántida, known as La Blanquita, at one point, this was the largest producer of consumer goods in Honduras; it is now defunct.
 Banco Atlántida, oldest Bank in the country, founded in 1913.
 Mazapan School, the first bilingual school of the nation, the oldest high school and second oldest elementary school in the city.
 
The first municipal building or city hall was located in the corner of 2da Calle and Avenida Atlántida, at the site of the present-day Ferretería Kawas warehouse. The building was made of wood and in 1903 it was burnt down due to vandalism. Some people wanted to destroy private property ownership records in La Ceiba. The municipal building was set on fire again on 7 March 1914 during more social unrest.

The Municipal Corporation moved the offices further south of the city. They were burned again during unrest in 1924. Soon after this, the office building was constructed at its current location, on land donated by Manuel Mejía.

Geography

Climate 
La Ceiba features a trade-wind tropical rainforest climate (Köppen Af), with substantial rainfall throughout the course of the year. Due to its northerly aspect, there is a peak between October and February when the trade winds are strongest and extreme orographic rainfalls occur.

Economy 

Among Honduran cities, La Ceiba is the second most important port town after Puerto Cortés. Its economy is made up of mostly commerce and agriculture. Pineapple is the city's major export. Its largest producer is the Standard Fruit Company, a subsidiary of the Dole Food Company, which operates throughout northern Honduras and is based in La Ceiba.

Tourism also plays a large role in the city's economy (see below). Since its development in the late 20th century, the La Ceiba seaport has played an ever-increasing role in the economy of the city. This port represents a vital economic artery to La Ceiba's growing tourist industry. Additionally, the La Ceiba sea port is home to one of the finest boatyards in the north west Caribbean (According to Western Caribbean Cruising Guidebook). Known as the La Ceiba Shipyard, this company offers a complete group of marine services for all types of seagoing vessels.

Education 
La Ceiba is home to many public schools. Among the largest is Escuela Francisco Morazán along Avenida San Isidro, which is considered the main street of the city. Instituto Manuel Bonilla is the largest public High School in the city, with over 5,000 registered students.

There are also many private schools in La Ceiba. Several private bilingual education schools offer instruction in both Spanish and English. Most of these offer a Honduran Bachillerato Diploma (equivalent of High school diploma), while Mazapan School offers a US-accredited High School diploma as well. These schools usually offer grades 1 – 11/12, with some offering pre-school education.

The first university in the city was the Centro Universitario Regional del Litoral Atlántico (often called CURLA). It is a Public university run by the larger Universidad Nacional Autonoma de Honduras (UNAH).

The first private university to open in the city was Universidad Tecnológica de Honduras(UTH), which opened in 1995. At the time the college offered only night classes, using the classrooms in a local private high school. In 2002 the college built its own campus. 2002 also marked the opening of the Universidad Católica de Honduras, run by the Catholic church. Additionally, development of a new campus in La Ceiba for the Universidad Tecnológica Centroamericana – UNITEC was begun in 2008.

Tourism 

La Ceiba has long been known as the tourism capital of Honduras, due to its proximity to the beach, active night life, and a variety of parks and recreational areas in and around the city. Another factor contributing to the city's tourism is the city port. It provides ferry services to the Bay Islands/Islas de la Bahia in the Caribbean. Ferries from this port also offer daily service to the main islands of Útila and Roatán.

The area around La Ceiba has many parks and natural reserves. Its most recognised natural area is the Pico Bonito (Beautiful Peak) National park. This park's most recognised feature, Pico Bonito on the Nombre de Dios mountain range, is 2435 meters high and provides a back drop for the city. The Cangrejal River, popular for its Class III-IV river rafting, borders the eastern edge of the city and the Cuero and Salado Wildlife refuges with its wild manatees is located a few miles to the west of the city.

Semana Santa (Holy Week) is one of the city's busiest tourist seasons. During this week tourists from all over the country flock to the city to enjoy its sun, beach, and very active night life during that week during Carnaval before Ash Wednesday.

The busiest tourist season by far is the week leading up to the internationally renowned "Gran Carnaval Internacional de La Ceiba" which is a citywide celebration in honour of the city's patron saint, St. Isidore (San Isidro). During the week leading up to the third Saturday in May, many neighbourhoods have smaller celebrations in one or a couple of their streets. On Saturday afternoon the big parade with elaborate floats takes place along Avenida San Isidro, the city's main thoroughfare. After the parade, the locals and tourists all have a celebration along that same road, where stands sell food, beer, drinks, and souvenirs.

Transportation 

There were trains running through La Ceiba to bring the bananas from the plantations but they are not active any longer although traces of the old railroad tracks can still be seen. Nowadays a 3 km-long city rail line still works and, in the nearby village of La Unión, it exists a short tourist railway to Cuero y Salado National Park.

Buses and taxis make up most of the public transportation in the city, with numerous buses serving almost every available route in the city. Taxi-cabs are numerous in the city, costing as little as L.25.00 (just over $1.25 as of 2013) for destinations within the city limits.

The pier to the east of the city offers transportation via ferry to 2 of the 3 major islands that make up Islas de la Bahia; Roatan and Utila. The Golosón International Airport to the west of town offers flights to the other major cities in the country as well as other towns in the Mosquitia Region of Honduras in the east. This airport is hub to Aerolíneas Sosa. There is also a bus station just west of the city centre though some buses also run from their own terminals.

Sport 
La Ceiba is the home of two clubs of the top division of the Honduran National Professional Football League, Vida and Victoria. Both play in Nilmo Edwards Stadium. The matches between the two rival clubs are known as Clásico Ceibeño.

Notable people 
 Guillermo Anderson – musician and recording artist, recipient of the Honduras La Orden Laurel de Oro
 José Azcona del Hoyo – former President of Honduras from 1986 to 1990
 Marvin Chávez – professional footballer for the San Jose Earthquakes in Major League Soccer
 Víctor Bernárdez – professional footballer for the San Jose Earthquakes in Major League Soccer
 Dunia Elvir – television journalist and producer
 David Meza – former radio journalist
 Jerry Palacios – professional footballer for Marathón in the Liga Nacional de Fútbol de Honduras
 Johnny Palacios – professional footballer for Olimpia in the Liga Nacional de Fútbol de Honduras
 Milton Palacios – professional footballer for Victoria in the Liga Nacional de Fútbol de Honduras
 Wilson Palacios – professional footballer for Stoke City in the Premier League
Arnold Peralta – former professional footballer who last played for Olimpia in the Liga Nacional de Fútbol de Honduras
 Williams Reyes – professional footballer for FAS in the Salvadoran Primera División
 Hendry Thomas – professional footballer for Wigan Athletic in the Premier League
 Steve Van Buren – former National Football League player and member of the Pro Football Hall of Fame
 Alfredo 'Dr. Sebi' Bowman – Natural healer, Health & Wellness lecturer, Founder of USHA Village, La Ceiba, Honduras

Twin towns – sister cities
 Broken Arrow, United States
 Cali, Colombia
 San Cristóbal, Venezuela
 Santa Ana, El Salvador
 Tela, Honduras

In fiction 
 In Paul Theroux's novel The Mosquito Coast, Allie Fox, disillusioned with America's materialistic culture, abandons his native country and emigrates with his family to Honduras, initially disembarking at the city of La Ceiba before making his way inland with a vision of starting a new life.

See also
Corozal, Honduras
Puerto Cortes, Honduras
Trujillo, Honduras

References

External links 

 
 Interactive Map La Ceiba, Atlantida
 Railroad pics in La Ceiba

 
Municipalities of the Atlántida Department
Populated places established in 1872
1872 establishments in Honduras